The Chasan Villa was an ocean front house on Paseo del Mar in Palos Verdes, California. The villa was destroyed in after a landslide destabilized the cliffs underneath the property.

Design 

In the late 1970s, Roslyn Chasan, along with her husband Fred Chasan, set out to build a villa designed for entertaining in Los Angeles, California. Working with architect Roy Bayer, Roslyn constructed a large Mediterranean-style villa on Paseo del Mar off of Palos Verdes Drive on the Palos Verdes Peninsula. The house was the subject of press coverage, where photos of the house appeared in print.

The exterior of the estate was coated in a light-creme stucco with a red Spanish-style roof tiles. The property featured many arches, that were in some places recessed providing a shadow depth effect, and columns carved out of native limestone in Guadalajara, Mexico and reassembled on-site were placed between archways. Doors were hand carved of loblolly pine and the flooring was a mixture of stone, tile, and manicured lawn. 

The property featured several places designed for events including a test kitchen large enough to host group cooking classes as well as three independent guest houses with a private interconnected roof deck with an in-built swimming pool and wet bar where gatherings could be held separate from the rest of the property.

Landslide and legal settlement 
Although geological surveys were conducted before construction began, these reports were found later in court to be faulty. The defective and neglected city-owned storm drain system built in the 1920s was leaking and after a California Water Service Company water main broke, a landslide destabilized the cliffs holding up the villa. Walls cracked, floors buckled, and staircases crumbled, requiring the Chasan family to evacuate the villa and abandon the property in 1981.

In 1982, Roslyn Chasan sued the city and in a unanimous decision, a jury found that the city was negligent and did not repair the leaking storm drain system and also found the geological survey company as well as the California Water Service at fault. The city and its insurance company settled the case for $2.5 million and subsequently acquired the property from the Chasan family for a nominal sum.

Aftermath 
After acquiring the condemned property, the city began dismantling the property in 1983, and in 1984 the city hired contractors to fully demolish the property and remove all remaining appurtenances that had not fallen into the ocean.
In November 2011, another landslide caused more of Paseo del Mar to fall into the ocean; the road was not repaired afterwards. At the time it was noted that other buildings nearby to the site once occupied by the villa were also in danger of falling into the Pacific Ocean.

Gallery

See also 

 Paseo del Mar – street the villa was built on

References 

Villas in the United States
Houses in the United States
Houses in California
Houses in Los Angeles County, California

Demolished buildings and structures in Los Angeles